The Ellipse Zenith is a French high-wing, single-place, hang glider that was designed and produced by La société Ellipse of Étuz.

Design and development
The Zenith was designed as a competition hang glider and was built in only one size. With structural reinforcement it is also suitable for adding a motorized harness for powered hang glider operations.

The Zenith is made from aluminum tubing, with the wing covered in Dacron sailcloth. Its  span wing is cable braced from a single kingpost. The nose angle is 132° and the aspect ratio is 7.7:1.

Variants
Zenith 150
Zenith 150 Moteur

Specifications (Zenith 150)

References

Hang gliders